Precis sinuata, the wide-banded commodore, is a butterfly in the family Nymphalidae. It is found in Guinea, Sierra Leone, Liberia, Ivory Coast, Ghana, Nigeria, Cameroon, Equatorial Guinea, São Tomé and Príncipe, the Republic of the Congo, the Central African Republic, the Democratic Republic of the Congo, Uganda, Rwanda, Burundi, Kenya, Tanzania, Malawi, Zambia and Mozambique. The habitat consists of forests and woodland.

The larvae feed on Platostoma species.

Subspecies
Precis sinuata sinuata — Guinea, Sierra Leone, Liberia, Ivory Coast, Ghana, Nigeria, Cameroon, São Tomé Island, Congo, Central African Republic, Democratic Republic of the Congo, Burundi, Tanzania, northern Malawi, Zambia, Mozambique
Precis sinuata hecqui Berger, 1981 — Democratic Republic of the Congo: Kivu, western Uganda, Rwanda, western Kenya, north-western Tanzania

References

Butterflies described in 1880
Junoniini
Butterflies of Africa